Swingalong is a Canadian music television series which aired on CBC Television in 1962.

Premise
This Winnipeg-produced series featured easy listening songs. Regulars included Florence Faiers and the Swingalong Chorus, with host Doug Crosley.

Scheduling
This half-hour series was broadcast on Tuesdays at 4:00 p.m. (Eastern time) from 3 July to 28 September 1962.

References

External links
 

CBC Television original programming
1962 Canadian television series debuts
1962 Canadian television series endings